Reel History of Britain is a 20 part series presented by Melvyn Bragg about the history of modern Britain through the eyes of people who were there. It was first broadcast on BBC Two, from 5–30 September 2011. The programme is a social history documentary charting the course of the twentieth century through archive film, plus interviews and recollections of key events that have taken place in the last one-hundred years since the advent of moving film.

In each episode, Bragg goes to a different place in the UK and shows people film in a 1950s Ministry of Technology mobile cinema, then gauges their reactions and captures them on film.

The series has an original score composed by Bert Appermont and Graham Reilly which was performed by the BBC Philharmonic and recorded at BBC Studios Manchester.

References

External links
 
 

2010s British documentary television series
2011 British television series debuts
2011 British television series endings
Television series about the history of the United Kingdom
English-language television shows
BBC television documentaries about history during the 20th Century